Paul Alan (born February 21, 1971 in Flint Michigan) is a Contemporary Christian music (CCM) artist and songwriter from Grand Rapids, Michigan. After leading the group Nouveaux in the 1990s, he had several charting solo singles in the 2000s.

Nouveaux
Alan was the lead singer of the Christian pop/rock band Nouveaux. The band began by performing for drug education in Michigan schools. With the band, he wrote the #1 songs "If Only" and "Maybe Tomorrow".

Solo
Alan went solo in 2001. He released the song "To Bring You Back" which charted in the Top 20 on the Country/CCM charts in 2008. He also had hits with the songs "She’s The Reason" (peaking in the top ten) and "Leaving Lonely." Alan's music was featured on Live with Regis and Kelly and the movie "Left Behind."

Solo Discography
 Falling Awake (2001)
 Drive It Home (2008)

References

1961 births
Living people
20th-century American singers
20th-century Christians
21st-century American singers
21st-century Christians
American performers of Christian music
Christian music songwriters
Christians from Michigan
Performers of contemporary Christian music